Londesborough Park railway station was a short-lived private station on the York to Beverley Line at Londesborough in the East Riding of Yorkshire, England. It was created as a private station for George Hudson of Londesborough Hall. It closed in January 1867.

References

External links
 

Disused railway stations in the East Riding of Yorkshire
Former York and North Midland Railway stations
Railway stations in Great Britain closed in 1867